Getty-Dubay Italic is a modern  teaching script for handwriting based on Latin script, developed in 1976 in Portland, Oregon, by Barbara Getty and Inga Dubay with the aim of allowing learners to make an easier transition from print writing to cursive.

Characteristics
Getty-Dubay Italic is designed as a semi-cursive Italic script. Other than strokes to join the letters, only the lower-case letter 'k' and a few upper-case letters have forms different from their printed equivalents. Getty-Dubay Italic is written with a slant of 85 degrees, measured counterclockwise from the baseline.

Prevalence
It has been claimed that about one-third of US homeschoolers (and about 7% of US schoolchildren generally) now learn Getty-Dubay Italic rather than conventional manuscript-then-cursive handwriting styles.

Publishing
Getty-Dubay Italic books were previously published by Portland State University and are now self-published by the authors and Allport Editions.

See also
 Spencerian script, a US teaching script
 Palmer script, a US teaching script
 D'Nealian script, a US teaching script
 Zaner-Bloser script, a US teaching script
 BFH script, a US teaching script
 Regional handwriting variation

References

External links
 Getty-Dubay Italic official site

Penmanship
Typefaces and fonts introduced in 1976